The Alexander von Humboldt Professorship is an academic prize named after Alexander von Humboldt and awarded by the Alexander von Humboldt Foundation since 2008. The prize is intended to attract internationally leading scientists from abroad to Germany so that they can carry out top-level research there and strengthen Germany as a research location. The prize includes a permanent full professorship at the hosting university, plus 5 million euros for experimentally working scientists or 3.5 million euros for theoretically working scientists (in addition, the university is expected to provide matching funds). This makes it the most highly endowed research prize in Germany, and possibly world-wide. A maximum of ten Alexander von Humboldt Professorships can be awarded every year to researchers of all disciplines. From 2020 to 2024, an additional six Humboldt Professorships in the field of artificial intelligence can be awarded each year.

Nominations are made by German universities, possibly in cooperation with research institutions.  The award is financed by the Federal Ministry of Education and Research within the framework of the International Research Fund for Germany.

List of Alexander von Humboldt Professorships 
Previous laureates were:

2009:

 Oliver Brock (* 1969), German computer scientist
 Piet Wibertus Brouwer (* 1971), Dutch theoretical solid state physicist
 Gia Dwali (* 1964), Georgian particle physicist and cosmologist
 Ulrike Gaul (* 1960), German developmental biologist
 Norbert Langer (* 1958), German astrophysicist
Martin Bodo Plenio (* 1968), German quantum optician
Burkhard Rost (* 1961), German bioinformatician

2010:

Marc Levine (* 1952), US-American mathematician
 Jürgen Margraf (* 1956), German psychologist
Gerard J. van den Berg (born 1962), Dutch economist
 Philip van der Eijk (* 1962), Dutch classical philologist
 Matthias Wessling (* 1963), German process engineer

2011:

 Harald Clahsen (* 1955), German psycholinguist
David DiVincenzo (* 1959), American physicist
Brian Foster (* 1954), British elementary particle physicist
 Gerhard Kramer (* 1970), Canadian-German communications engineer
Dirk Kreimer (* 1960), German theoretical physicist
Hannes Leitgeb (* 1972), Austrian philosopher and mathematician
 Vahid Sandoghdar (* 1966), Iranian-American physicist
 Alec Wodtke (* 1959), US-American chemist

2012:

 Rolf Harald Baayen (* 1958), Dutch linguist
Friedrich Eisenbrand (* 1971), German mathematician (funding ended prematurely)
 Jochen Guck (* 1973), German biophysicist
 Hans-Arno Jacobsen (* 1969), German computer scientist
 Robert Schober (* 1971), German engineer
Matthias Tschöp (* 1967), German physician
Michael Weiss (* 1955), German mathematician

2013:

 Gregory Crane (* 1957), US-American classical philologist
 Frank Fehrenbach (* 1963), German art historian
Michael Neil Forster (* 1957), US-American philosopher
Stephan Hartmann (* 1968), German philosopher of science
 Michael Köhl (* 1975), German physicist
 Oskar Painter (* 1972), Canadian physicist (funding ended prematurely)
 Wolfram Ruf (* 1958), German medical doctor

2014:

 Giuseppe Caire (* 1965), Italian information theorist
 Emmanuelle Charpentier (* 1968), French immunobiologist
 Stefanie Engel (* 1968), German environmental economist
Stuart Parkin (* 1955), British physicist
 Andreas S. Schulz (* 1969), German mathematician
 Jairo Sinova (* 1972), Spanish-US-American physicist
 Hidenori Takagi (* 1961), Japanese physicist

2015:

 Elisabeth Décultot (* 1968), French literary scholar
Harald Andrés Helfgott (* 1977), Peruvian mathematician
 Sharon Jeanette Macdonald (* 1961), British ethnologist
Karen Radner (* 1971), Austrian Orientalist
 Marja Timmermans (* 1964), plant geneticist

2016:

Till Winfried Bärnighausen (* 1969), German epidemiologist
 Sven Bernecker (* 1967), German philosopher
William Crawley-Boevey (* 1960), British mathematician
Heinrich Jasper (* 1974), German molecular biologist
 Tiffany Knight (* 1975), US ecologist and environmental researcher
 Katrin Kogman-Appel (* 1958), Austrian Judaist
 Judith Pfeiffer (* 1964), German Islamic scholar
 Wolfgang Wernsdorfer (* 1966), German solid-state physicist

2017:

 Largus T. Angenent (* 1969), Dutch environmental microbiologist
 Peter Baumann (* 1969), German cell biologist
 Jijie Chai (* 1966), Chinese structural biologist
 James F. Conant (* 1958), US-American philosopher
 Wolf-Bernd Frommer (* 1958), German plant molecular biologist
 Ran Hirschl (* 1963), Israeli constitutional lawyer

2018:

Anne van Aaken (* 1969), German jurist and economist
Wil van der Aalst (* 1966), Dutch computer scientist
 Bogdan Andrei Bernevig (* 1978), Romanian physicist
 Marco Caccamo (* 1971), Italian computer scientist
 Margaret C. Crofoot (* 1980), US biologist
 Ewa Dąbrowska (* 1963), Polish linguist
 Raul Fidel Tempone (* 1969), Italian-Uruguayan mathematician
 Arno Rauschenbeutel (* 1971), German quantum optician and nuclear physicist
 Guus F. Rimmelzwaan (* 1959), Dutch virologist and immunobiologist
 Michael Sieweke (* 1963), German cell biologist

2019:

 Malte Gather, German physicist
Anke Hoeffler, German economist and political scientist
 Jens Meiler, German structural biologist
 Alexandre Obertelli (* 1978), French nuclear physicist
Stefanie Petermichl (* 1971), German mathematician
 Dietmar Schmucker, German neuroscientist
 Henning Walczak (* 1966), German immunologist
Enrique Zuazua (* 1961), Spanish mathematician

2020:

 Peter Dayan (* 1965), Theoretical Neuroscience
 Kristian Franze, Physical Biology
 Francisco Jesus Moreno-Fernández, Linguistics
 Daniel Rückert, Computer Science

2021: 

 , History of Science & Sinology
 Christian Frezza, Metabolic Physiology
 Oskar Hallatschek, Biophysics
 Ive Hermans, Chemiker
 Stefan G. Hofmann, Translational Clinical Psychology
 Gustav Holzegel, Mathematics
 Jan Huisken, Medical Engineering
 Kou Murayama, Psychology
 Angela Schoellig, Robotics and Artificial Intelligence
 Bart Thomma, Microbiology
 Thorsten Wagener, Hydrology
 Aimee van Wynsberghe, AI and Robot Ethics

2022:

 Catherina G. Becker, German neurobiologist
 Matthias Doepke, economic theorist
 Bas E. Dutilh, bioinformatics scientist
 Holger Hoos, computer scientist
 Stefanie Jegelka, computer scientist
 Yaochu Jin, Chinese computer scientist
 Jan Karlseder, molecular biologist
 Markus Klute, German physicist
 Sven Koenig, computer scientist
 Sayan Mukherjee, Indian mathematician
 Vincent C. Müller, philosopher
 Kate Rigby, environmental humanities scholar
 Joacim Rocklöv, Swedish epidemiologist
 Suvrit Sra, mathematician
 Radu Timofte, Romanian computer scientist
 Angela Yu, neuroscientist

2023:

 Samarjit Chakraborty, computer scientist 
 Dirk Englung, physicist
 Hanna Kokko, bioinformatician
Tina Malti, clinical-developmental psychologist
 Edvardas Narevicius, chemist
 Thomas C. Südhof, neuroscientist
 Heike Vallery, mechanical engineer
 André Platzer, computer scientist
 Thomas Strohmer, mathematician
 Ingmar Weber, computer scientist

References 

Alexander von Humboldt
German science and technology awards